LATI (Linee Aeree Transcontinentali Italiane, "Italian Transcontinental Airlines") was an early transatlantic airline operating between Italy and South America between 1939 and 1941. Although the transatlantic service was permanently discontinued in December 1941 following the entry of the United States into World War II, the company continued to exist until 1956.

History

LATI was created on September 1939 and the first flight was done between Rome and Brasil on December of the same year with the route:

 Roma - Sevilla - Lisboa - Villa Cisneros - Ilha do Sal (European section);
Ilha do Sal - Fernando de Noronha  - Recife (Atlantic section);
Recife -  Salvador - Rio de Janeiro (South American section).

For the first flight the Italian and Portuguese government created a new airport in the Ilha do Sal: this first airport on Cape Verde was built in 1939 as a fuel and provisions stopping-point on routes from Rome to South America. The first flight, an arrival from Rome and Seville, was on 15 December 1939 (in 1947, the Portuguese colonial government purchased the airport from Italian interests).

The flight from Rome to Rio de Janeiro lasted 23 hours (for the 9,200 km distance).

In summer 1941 the route was expanded, to reach Buenos Aires (capital of Argentina).

On January 15, 1941 during the return trip of the transatlantic flight # 104, the SM-75 tagged Y-BAYR was lost on the Atlantic ocean with 8 flight crew and 2 passengers: it seems that was overcharged (more than 10 tons) with diamonds and special materials that were needed for military industrial production in Italy. It was the only disaster that struck the route.

The last transatlantic flight was done in December 1941, after the United States declaration of war in WW2, that stopped all flights from Italy across the Atlantic ocean. However the LATI flights remained operative, and were done until September 1943 but only between Rome and Sevilla - Lisboa.

LATI did 211 trans-Atlantic flights, of which 132 were done with a special Savoia-Marchetti SM 83. The speed reached 300 km/h but it was only allowed a transport of up to 500 kg. The flights were commercial flights for postal services but a few passengers were allowed to use the transatlantic route. Furthermore, according to Samuel Pezzillo, LATI had been able to pick up much of the mail traffic that German Lufthansa had provided to South America prior to ending its service in August, 1939: it was the main carrier of postal services between Western Europe occupied by the Axis and South America until December 1941.

See also 
 Transatlantic flight
 List of defunct airlines of Italy

References

External links
 The Italian Air Service to South America (December 1939—December 1941), by Samuel J. Pezzillo

Italian companies established in 1939
1956 disestablishments in Italy
Defunct airlines of Italy
Airlines disestablished in 1956
Airlines established in 1939